Giuseppe Maria Scotese (1916–2002) was an Italian screenwriter and film director.

Selected filmography
 Fear No Evil (1945)
 The Models of Margutta (1946)
 The Great Dawn (1947)
 Carmen (1953)
 The Red Cloak (1955)
 Pirate of the Half Moon (1957)
 Questo amore ai confini del mondo (1960)
 Miracles Still Happen (1974)

References

Bibliography 
 Goble, Alan. The Complete Index to Literary Sources in Film. Walter de Gruyter, 1999.

External links 
 

1916 births
2002 deaths
Italian film directors
20th-century Italian screenwriters
Italian male screenwriters
20th-century Italian male writers